Einøvlingseggen is a mountain in Innlandet county, Norway. The mountain is surrounded by several other notable mountains including Tverrfjellet to the east, Brunkollen and Snøhetta to the north, and Skredahøin and Storstyggesvånåtinden to the northwest.

See also
List of mountains of Norway

References

Dovre
Lesja
Mountains of Innlandet